Donald Frederick Walker (15 August 1912 – 18 June 1941) was an English first-class cricketer who played for Hampshire between 1937 and 1939. A left-handed batsman and occasional wicketkeeper Walker played 73 first-class games for Hampshire. In 1937 during a County Championship match played against Sussex, at the United Services Recreation Ground Walker and Gerry Hill put on 235 for the 5th wicket, which remains to this day a Hampshire record. A patient batsman, Walker was able to manufacture an innings with great touch. His best season came in 1939, in what was to be his last season. Walker scored 1,117 runs, including three centuries; average 29.39.

Walker was also a strong Rugby player, he captained the Dorset County team and also captained a Royal Air Force side.

Military career and death

With the onset of the Second World War Walker joined the Royal Air Force. He was commissioned as a flight lieutenant and was assigned to No. 58 Squadron to fly Armstrong Whitworth Whitley bombers as part of Bomber Command. On 17 June 1941, Walker took off from RAF Linton-on-Ouse as the pilot of Whitley Mark V bomber N1462 to conduct a bombing raid on Cologne. On the Whitley's way back to base, the bomber was spotted by search lights, and Oberleutnant Wolfgang Thimmig was scrambled from Venlo Airfield to intercept the bomber. The Whitley was shot down at 2:34 hours on 18 June near Best. The kill was claimed by Thimmig's Messerschmitt Bf 110, his first victory. 4 out of 5 on the aircraft were killed, including Walker. The sole survivor was captured with wounds to both legs and sent to a German prison camp. Walker and his crew are buried at Eindhoven General Cemetery.

References

External links

1912 births
1941 deaths
English cricketers
Hampshire cricketers
People from Wandsworth
Royal Air Force officers
Royal Air Force personnel killed in World War II
Aviators killed by being shot down
Military personnel from London